The Fox Fur Nebula is a nebula (a formation of gas and dust) located in the constellation of Monoceros (the Unicorn) not far off the right arm of Orion and included in the NGC 2264 Region. In the Sharpless catalog it is number 273.

The image is a close-up of a small section of a much larger complex, generally known as the Christmas Tree cluster. The Cone Nebula is also a part of this same cloud.

The red regions of this nebula are caused by hydrogen gas that has been stimulated to emit its own light by the copious ultraviolet radiation coming from the hot, blue stars of the cluster.  The blue areas shine by a different process: they are mainly dust clouds that reflect the bluish light of the same stars.

Its popular name arises because the nebula looks like the head of a stole made from the fur of a red fox.

References

External links 
 The Fox Fur Nebula
 APOD: 2015 December 30 - The Fox Fur Nebula
 
 
 
 The Fox Fur Nebula
 Best of AOP: The Fox Fur Nebula 
 APOD: 14 marca 2005 - The Fox Fur Nebula
 Cone and Fox Fur Nebula Region
 Fox Fur Nebula Photo

NGC 2264
H II regions
Monoceros (constellation)
Sharpless objects